The 2011 Northwestern Wildcats football team represented Northwestern University during the 2011 NCAA Division I FBS football season. Pat Fitzgerald, in his sixth season at Northwestern, was the team's head coach. The Wildcats home games were played at Ryan Field in Evanston, Illinois. They are members of the Legends Division of the Big Ten Conference. They finished the season 6–7, 3–4 in Big Ten play to finish in fifth place in the Legends Division. They were invited to the Meineke Car Care Bowl of Texas where they were defeated by Texas A&M 22–33.

Previous season
In 2010 the Wildcats had a 7–6 record, ending the season with a 45–38 loss to Texas Tech in the 2011 TicketCity Bowl.

Preseason

Conference divisions
Starting in 2011, the Big Ten Conference created two divisions, "Legends" and "Leaders", following the University of Nebraska's membership into the conference. Northwestern was placed in the "Legends" division, with the University of Iowa, the University of Michigan, Michigan State University, the University of Minnesota and the University of Nebraska joining them.

Schedule
The schedule is as follows:

Regular season

Boston College

Eastern Illinois

Army

Illinois

Michigan

Iowa

Penn State

Indiana

Nebraska

Rice

Minnesota

Michigan State

Meineke Car Care Bowl of Texas

Texas A&M

Rankings

Roster

References

Northwestern
Northwestern Wildcats football seasons
Northwestern Wildcats football